Libya has a long history and has been in contact with many other civilizations, from pre-historic age to the modern age, passing through so many ages such as: Garamantes, Greek, Roman, Islamic and many other ages.

See also

List of buildings and structures in Libya
List of museums

External links 
 Libya - Libraries and museums 
 The Museum of Libya, and other museums

Museums
Libya
List
Museums
Museums
Libya